The men's 200 metres at the 2004 Summer Olympics as part of the athletics program was held at the Athens Olympic Stadium from August 24 to 26. There were 54 competitors from 41 nations. The event was won by Shawn Crawford of the United States, the nation's 17th victory in the men's 200 metres. His teammates Bernard Williams (silver) and Justin Gatlin (bronze) completed the sixth American sweep in the event and first since 1984.

Barely turned eighteen, Usain Bolt came to the Olympics injured and was not able to compete at the level he had achieved earlier in the season. He was eliminated in the heats in his only Olympic defeat. He would eventually go on to win double gold at the Beijing, triple at London and Rio Olympics.

Background

This was the 24th appearance of the event, which was not held at the first Olympics in 1896 but has been on the program ever since. Two of the eight finalists from the 2000 Games returned: silver medalist Darren Campbell and fifth-place finisher Christian Malcolm, both of Great Britain. The 1992 and 1996 silver medalist, Frankie Fredericks of Namibia, had missed the 2000 Games due to injury but returned in 2004. Reigning Olympic champion Konstantinos Kenteris of Greece missed a drug test the day before the Games opened, resulting in his suspension.

Azerbaijan, the Czech Republic, Palau, and Slovenia each made their debut in the event. The United States made its 23rd appearance, most of any nation, having missed only the boycotted 1980 Games.

Summary

The final pool looked similar to the 100 metres final pool, with the favorites, Justin Gatlin, Francis Obikwelu and Shawn Crawford in the center of the track. Bernard Williams also was in the final, along with perennial silver medalist Frankie Fredericks. From the gun, Williams near the inside got a clearly better start, quickly making up a step on the stagger to Crawford to his outside. But through the turn, Crawford maintained the distance while running the further distance. Crawford and Gatlin ran about even last portion of the turn looked more powerful than Williams and Gatlin on either side. By the end of the turn, it was the three Americans in the lead, led by Crawford, Obikwelu the closest challenger a step behind. Crawford separated from Gatlin at the head of the straight and the race was for second. Gatlin held the edge down the straight until the last ten metres when Gatlin seemed to struggle and Williams cruised to silver. Next to last at the beginning of the straight, veteran Fredericks gained steadily and was able to dip past Obikwelu for fourth, but not enough to break up the American sweep.

Qualification

The Olympic qualification period for the athletics ran from 1 January 2003 to 9 August 2004. For this event, each National Olympic Committee (NOC) was permitted to enter up to three athletes, provided they had run below 20.59 seconds during this period in IAAF-sanctioned meetings or tournaments. If a NOC had no athletes qualified under this standard, it could enter up to one athlete that had run below 20.75 seconds.

Competition format

The competition used the four round format introduced in 1920: heats, quarterfinals, semifinals, and a final. The "fastest loser" system introduced in 1960 was used in the heats and quarterfinals.

There were 7 heats of 7 or 8 runners each, with the top 4 men in each advancing to the quarterfinals along with the next 4 fastest overall. The quarterfinals consisted of 4 heats of 8 athletes each; the 3 fastest men in each heat and the next 4 fastest overall advanced to the semifinals. There were 2 semifinals, each with 8 runners. The top 4 athletes in each semifinal advanced. The final had 8 runners. The races were run on a 400 metre track.

Records
, the existing world and Olympic records were as follows.

No new world or Olympic records were set during the competition.

Schedule

The competition used a three-day schedule rather than a two-day schedule, splitting the semifinals and final into two days. The three-day schedule had previously been used in 1992, but before that had last been used in 1908.

All times are Eastern European Summer Time (UTC+3)

Results

Heats

Qualification rule: The first four finishers in each heat (Q) plus the next four fastest overall runners (q) qualified.

Heat 1

Heat 2

Heat 3

Heat 4

Heat 5

Heat 6

Heat 7

Quarterfinals

Qualification rule: The first three finishers in each heat (Q) plus the next four fastest overall runners (q) advance to the semifinals.

Quarterfinal 1

Quarterfinal 2

Quarterfinal 3

Quarterfinal 4

Semifinals

Qualification rule: The first four runners in each semifinal heat (Q) moves on to the final.

Semifinal 1

Semifinal 2

Final

References

External links
 IAAF Athens 2004 Olympic Coverage

M
200 metres at the Olympics
Men's events at the 2004 Summer Olympics